The Borough of Guildford is a local government district with borough status in Surrey, England.  With around half of the borough's population, Guildford is its largest settlement and only town, and is the location of the council.

The district was formed on 1 April 1974, under the Local Government Act 1972 by an amalgamation of the municipal borough of Guildford and Guildford Rural District.

Functions
Borough councillors and officers work on devolved issues such as parks, leisure, older residents' services, youth services, streetscene, refuse collection, planning and aspects of business and tourism; Surrey County Council deal with transport, publicly owned infrastructure planning and maintenance, education, social services and overall waste management.    The Borough owns significant heritage assets that 
include monuments such as Guildford Castle, as well museums, art collections and civic regalia.

Population
Guildford has the second largest population of Surrey's eleven districts (based on census statistics, only 600 residents behind Reigate and Banstead). Approximately half of the Borough's population live in the town of Guildford.

Budget
To the year ending 31 March 2012, £106.629m was received by Guildford Borough Council, plus £7.43m from its financing/investment arm, plus £17.571m in other taxation and non-specific grants.

A large wholly exceptional overspend resulted from Guildford acquiring from central UK government all self-financing rights over housing for £192.435m, otherwise spending amounted to £136.778m.  Of this spending the largest item was non-Local Authority housing benefits and services amounting to £33.93m however accounting for £32.74m of income.  The largest item producing a net cost was Environmental and Regulatory Services costing £16.643m while contributing £6.861m.  Spending on this item fell by 2.63% compared to the 2010-2011 period.

Housing owned by the Borough
Housing stock owned by Guildford Borough Council is valued, as securely tenanted at £359.316m as at 1 April 2012.

If all of the housing stock were sold untenanted, or to present occupants at full value, then the correct value at that date was £995 million.

Taxation
Of the eleven Surrey districts, Guildford has the third-lowest Band-D council tax for 2012-13 and fourth-lowest average overall council tax (the level of difference is a reflection on an area's skew as to higher band properties).

Councillors

Elections 

Borough elections take place for the whole council on a four-year basis.

2 May 2019 saw the most recent cross-borough election that produced 17 Liberal Democrat seats, 15 Residents for Guildford and Villages (R4GV) seats, 9 Conservative seats, 4 Guildford Greenbelt Group (GGG) seats, 2 Labour seats and 1 Green seat on the borough council.

Administration 

Following the May 2019 borough council elections Guildford Borough Council is in no overall control meaning that no single political party or group has a majority of council seats.

On 15 May 2019 councillors voted by 23 to 19 to elect the Liberal Democrat group leader, Caroline Reeves, as Leader of Guildford Borough Council over the leader of the R4GV group, Joss Bigmore. On 20 May 2019 Caroline Reeves announced that (including herself) the council's Cabinet would consist of 8 Liberal Democrats, 1 R4GV and 1 GGG councillor with an additional R4GV councillor attending cabinet as a non-voting deputy. However, on 27 August 2019 the GGG member of the Cabinet resigned and was subsequently replaced by an additional R4GV councillor (the formerly non-voting deputy member of the Cabinet).

In May 2020 it was announced that an agreement had been reached between the Liberal Democrats and R4GV to rotate the council leadership between them as part of a coalition arrangement which saw four Liberal Democrat councillors leave the council's Cabinet and be replaced by two R4GV councillors to create an evenly split cabinet of four Liberal Democrat and four R4GV councillors. As part of this arrangement the leader of R4GV, Joss Bigmore, was appointed as the Deputy Leader of Guildford Borough Council. In October 2020 Joss Bigmore was elected as council leader for two years, due to the leadership rotating to R4GV, and in October 2022 Julia McShane was elected as council leader due to the leadership returning to the Liberal Democrats.

Political Composition 

Following the May 2019 election the Green councillor chose to sit on the council as part of the R4GV group. The political make-up of the council was altered in September 2019 when a Conservative councillor quit his party to sit as an Independent councillor, and again from July to December 2020 when four councillors left the official Conservative group and formed a separate 'Conservative Independent' group on the council before later re-joining the official Conservative group. However, these coun 

In June 2020 the death of Patrick Sheard, who was a GGG councillor for Send, caused a vacancy on the council. A by-election was delayed until the 2021 local elections and was held at the same as two other by-elections caused by resignations (one Independent and one Liberal Democrat resignation). The outcome of these by-elections restored the political balance of the council to the state it had been immediately after the May 2019 elections. In November 2021 a Liberal Democrat councillor defected to the Conservatives, but later left the Conservative group in July 2022 to sit as an independent councillor. 

A further by-election was held on 20 October 2022 following the death of former mayor Richard Billington, a Conservative councillor. The by-election was won by the Liberal Democrats. As a result of the by-election campaign the sole Green party councillor chose to leave the R4GV group to sit alone as a Green councillor.

In November 2022 a further councillor left the R4GV group to sit as an independent.

Members of Parliament

Composition
The central 'Guildford Town' area of the borough comprises the town centre and immediately surrounding areas, including: Bellfields, Boxgrove, Onslow Village, Park Barn, Stoughton, Westborough, and the (former) villages of Burpham, and Merrow.

Third tier of local government
Apart from the town of Guildford which has no third (or most local) tier, most of the rest of the borough has civil parishes of unpaid councillors who are entitled to charge a small extra precept for services they pay out for:

Premises
The council is based at Millmead House on Millmead in Guildford. The original house dates from the late seventeenth century, with extensive modern additions to the rear. Prior to the local government reorganisation of 1974, the building had been the headquarters of Guildford Rural District Council.

Notes and references
Notes 
  
References

 
Non-metropolitan districts of Surrey
Boroughs in England